Members of the National Assembly elected for the 2006-2011 term were as follows:

Bandundu Province

Kwango District 
 Feshi (1 seat) - Fulgence Fono Makiasi (PALU)
 Kahemba (1 seat) - Toussaint Kaditanga Kikwanza (PALU)
 Kasongo-Lunda (5 seats) -
 Emmanuel Kutonda Kolami Kiala (MLC)
 Samais-Valentin Mitendo Mwadi-Yinda (SODENA)
 Bieto Kutoma Silu (PALU)
 Albert Kutekala Kaawa (PPRD)
 Séraphin Bata Kyala Ngangu (ARC) 
 Kenge (4 seats) -
 Hubert Masala Loka Mutombo (ARC)
 Théophile Mbemba Fundu di Luyindu (PPRD)
 Christophe Mboso N'kodia Pwanga (CRD)
 Célestin Nkenda Kaslema (PALU)  
 Popokabaka (1 seat) - Jean-Pierre Pasi Zapamba Buka (CRD)

Kwilu District 
 Bagata (2 seats) -
 Sebastien Ngolomingi Mpele (PALU)
 Jacques Ebweme Yonzaba (CNAP) 
 Bulungu (9 seats) - 
 Willy Mubobo Nzama (PALU)
 Séraphin Zimba-Zimba Mw-Ha-Kikar (PALU)
 Baudoin Manzombi Kulumbamba (PALU)
 Olivier Kamitatu Etsu (FR)
 Cherry-Ernest Maboloko Ngulambangu (PALU)
 Delphin Mbanza Mangwata (PALU)
 Dieudonné Mupata Lugalu (CDC)
 Rose Biasima Lala (MSR)
 Jacques Sima Krulikiemun (MLC)
 Gungu (4 seats) -
 Francois Lemba Sala Midimo (PALU)
 Zenon Mukwakani Gahungu (PALU)
 Remy Metela Pulumba Mikaba (PALU)
 Ruffin Kikapa Kipanga (PALU)
 Idiofa (7 seats) - 
 Geneviève Pea-Pea Ndembo (PALU)
 Donatien Mazono Ansur-Ankus (PALU)
 Isidore Ntumba Mwangung (PALU)
 Nicolas Nteny Olele Afya (PALU)
 Constant N'Dom Nda Ombel (MLC)
 Aubin Minaku Ndjalandjoko (PPRD)
 Boris Mbuku Laka (FR)
 Kikwit (3 seats) - 
 Marc Mvwama Anedu (PALU)
 Georgine Madiko Mulende (PALU)
 Maleghi Lumeya Dhu (CP)
 Masi-Manimba (7 seats) -
 Raphael Lusasi Kimangidi (PALU)
 Balay Balalbala Kawanganda (PALU)
 Jean Kayenga Bandakela (PALU)
 Bernard Kazwala Mayanga (PALU)
 Théo Mukwabatu Buka (PALU)
 Tryphon Kin-Kiey Mulumba
 Garry Mabongo Katembo (UCC)

Mai-Ndombe District - 13 deputies 
 Bandundu ville (1 seat) - Prince Sylvestre Makila Ngakiber (Ind.)
 Bolobo (1 seat) - Barthelemy Botswali Lengomo (CODECO)
 Inongo (3 seats) -
 Marc Mwamikedi Makani (MARC-PTF)
 Albert M'Peti Biyombo (MLC)
 jean luc samba bahati (PDSC)
 Kiri (1 seat) - Edmond Lofonde Bosembu (Ind.)
 Kutu (3 seats) - 
 Joseph N'Singa Udjuu (UCRJ)
 Jean-Pierre Lebughe Izaley (CDC)
 Sebastien Lessedjina Ikwame (PRC)  
 Kwamouth (1 seat) - Jacques Katalay Mburubalo (MLC)
 Mushie (1 seat) - Bokiaga Pembe Didace (PDC) 
 Oshwe (1 seat) - Egide-Michel Ngokoso Apa (Ind.)
 Yumbi (1 seat) - Gentiny Ngobila Mbaka (PPRD)

Plateaux District

Bas-Congo - 24 deputies 
 Boma ville (2 seat) - 
 Adboul Ngoma Kosi (CODECO)
 Bosco Mananga Ma Tshiama (PPRD) 
 Kasangulu (1 seat) - Jean-Claude Vuemba Luzamba (MPCR)
 Kimvula (1 seat) - Ruffin Mpaka Mawete (REC-les Verts)
 Lukula (2 seats) - 
 Cesar Tsasa Di Ntumba (PPRD) 
 Cesar Khonde Mazombe (Ind.)
 Luozi (1 seat) - Nsemi Ne Muanda (Ind.)
 Madimba (3 seats) - 
 Simon Mboso Kiamputu (FR)
 Richard Makuba Lutondo (ACDC)
 Antoine Ghonda Mangalibi (PPRD)
 Matadi ville (3 seats) - 
 Lajos Bidiu Bas-Congo Nkebi (MLC) 
 Fabrice Puela Albert (FR) 
 Georgette Matondo Kati Mayala (PRRD)
 Mbanza-Ngungu (4 seats) - 
 Augustin Kisombe Kiaku Muisi (MDD) 
 Jacques Lunguana Matumona (MLC) 
 Marie-Madeleine Mienze Kiaku (PPRD)
 Gilbert Kiakwama Kia Kiziki (CDC) 
 Moanda (2 seats) - 
 Edmond Luzolo Lua-Nganga (MSR)
 Jean-Pierre Bangalyba Baly (MLC)
 Seke-Banza (1 seat) - Joseph Ngoma Di Nzau Matona (ARREN) 
 Songololo (2 seats) - 
 Joseph Mpaka Malundama 
 Alphonse Kembukuswa Ne Nlaza (NDD)
 Tshela (2 seats) - 
 Edmond Longo Ki Mbenza Makasi (PPRD)
 Pascal Ndudi Ndudi (PDC)

Équateur

Équateur District 10 deputies 
 Basankusu (1 seat) - Nicolas Akpanza Mobuli (MLC)
 Bikoro (2 seats) - 
 Henri Balengola Banyele (MLC)
 Joseph Ipalaka Yobwa (DCF-COFEDEC) 
 Bolomba (1 seat) - Pierre Maloka Makondji (PUNA)
 Bomongo (1 seat) - Patrick Mayombe Mumbyoko (MLC)
 Ingende (1 seat) - Micheline Bie Bongenge (MLC) 
 Lukolela (1 seat) - Eugene Lomata Etitingi (MLC) 
 Mankanza (1 seat) - Jean-Felix Mata Ebeka Ebama (MSR)
 Mbandaka ville (2 seats) - 
 Charles Bofasa Equateur Djema (GR)
 Jose Endundo Bononge (PDC)

Mongala District - 11 deputies  
 Bongandanga (3 seats) - 
 Fidel Tingombay Mondonga (Ind.)
 Dieudonne Agbumana Motingia (Ind.)
 Robert Bopolo Mbongenza Mbunga (PDC)
 Bumba (5 seats) - 
 Arsene Ambuku Goti (MLC)
 Omer Egwake Ya'Ngembe (MLC)
 Crispin Ngbundu Malengo (CP)
 Baudouin Mokoha Monga Adogo (Ren PE)
 Antoine Roger Bumba Monga Ngoy (PPRD)
 Lisala (3 seats) - 
 Jose Engbanda Mananga (RCDN)
 Marie-Louise Ekpoli Lenti (Ind.)
 Pascal Lipemba Ikpanga (MLC)

Nord-Ubangi District

Sud-Ubangi District - 18 deputies 
 Budjala (4 seats) - 
 Jean-Lucien Bussa Tongba (MLC)
 Jean-Matthieu Mohulemby Bubangakozo (UDEMO)
 Felix Vunduawe Te Pemako (MPR)
 Fulgence Mangbanzo Dua Engenza (PDC)
 Gemena (7 seats) - 
 Jose Makila Sumanda (MLC) 
 Rabbin Kpenumo Moolongawi 
 Gustave Alenge Nadonye (MLC) 
 Jacques Segbewi Zamu (PPRD) 
 Albert Gigba Gite (MLC)
 Pascal Selinga Kodeye-Wene (MSR) 
 Adel Degbalase Kanda (MLC)
 Kungu (4 seats) - 
 Jean-Marie Gapemonoko Lobotdumba (UDEMO)
 Leon Botoko Imeka (MLC) 
 Gaston Longina Bwana (Ind.)
 Jean-Bertin Atandele Soge (Ind.)
 Libenge (2 seats) - 
 Jean-Pierre Bobe Yaboy (MLC)
 Seraphin Ngwande Mebale-Balezu (PDC)
 Zongo ville (1 seat) - Vicky Bokolo Nyaswa (Ind.)

Tshuapa District - 9 seats 
 Befale (1 seat) - Dieudonne Kamona Yumba (PRM)
 Boende (2 seats) - 
 Willy Bakonga Wilima (PRM)
 Joseph Djema Ngoy Luma (MLC)
 Bokungu (2 seats) - 
 Titien Longomo Nsongo (UDEMO)
 Jean-Robert Lomanga Longenga (MLC)
 Djolu (1 seat) - Pancrace Boongo Nkoy (MLC)
 Ikela (2 seats) - 
 Ferdinard Ekam Wina (UNADEC)
 Jean-Bertrand Ewanga (PPRD)
 Monkoto (1 seat) - Francois Ekofo Panzoko Jean (UDEMO)

Kasai-Occidental

Kasai District

Lulua District

Kasai-Oriental

Tshilenge District 

 Territoire de Katanda (2 seats) 
Constantin Kasongo Munganga (RCDN)
 (UDPS)

Kabinda District - 12 deputies 
 Kabinda Territory (3 seats) - 
 Adolphe Lumanu Mulenda Bwana N'Sefu (PPRD)
 Jacques Sekoutoure Ndjibu Kapaule (CDC)
 Jean-Martin Mukonkole Kibongie Mukumadi (RCDN)
 Kamiji Territory (1 seat) 
 Jean-Chrysostome Mukanya Nkashama (FIS)
 Lubao Territory (2 seats) - 
 Jean-Pierre Mulenda Mbo Milamba (CDD)
 Joseph Kahenga Sompo (Ind.)
 Lupatapata Territory (1 seat) 
Gregoire Katende Wa Ndaya Muledi (FR) 
 Mwene-Ditu ville (2 seats) - 
 Georges Tshilengi Mbuyi Shambuyi
 Benjamin Ilunga Kazadi
 Ngandajika Territory (3 seats) - 
 Benjamin Muamba Mulunda (MLC)
 Alain Mbaya Kakasu (ADECO)
 Dieudonne Kazadi Nyembwe (PPRD)

Sankuru District

Katanga Province

Kolwezi District

Lualaba District

Haut-Lomami District - 17 deputies 
 Bukama (4 seats) -
 Rosen Mwenze Wakadilo (Ind.)
 Jean-Jacques Kalenga Wa Kubwilu (Ind.)
 Damase Muba Kitwa (PPRD)  
 Crispin Mutumbe Mbuya (UNAFEC)    
 Kabongo (4 seats) - 
 Yvonne Mutombo Ngoy (PPRD) 
 Kashemukunda Kasongo-Numbi (Ind.)
 Rene Nday Kabongo Kyanza Ngombe (MSR)  
 Buffon Banza Lupusa Biata-Biale (PRP)  
 Kamina (3 seats) - 
 Nkundu Mwenze Mutombo (Ind.)
 Eugenie Mbayo Kilumba (Ind.)
 Wilfrid Mbuya Mimbanga Mwabilwa (UNAFEC)   
 Malemba-Nkulu (4 seats) - 
 Aime Ngoy-Mukena Lusa-Diese (PPRD) 
 Ivan Mulongo Ngoy (UNAFEC)  
 Jean Mulunda Shimbi (Ind.)
 Che Kabimbi Ngoy Mwana Ngoy (Ind.)
 Sakania (2 seats)
 Fulbert Kunda Kisenga Milundu (MLC) 
 Moise Chokwe Cembo

Haut-Katanga District - 24 seats 
 Kambove (2 seats) -
 Denis Kashoba Kabonshi (MLC)
 Bernard Kwebwa Muwele (PPRD)
 Kaniama (1 seat) - Gilbert Kasongo Sakadi (PPRD)
 Kasenga (2 seats) - 
 Ghislain Kienge Dyashi (Ind.)
 Cyprien Kaubo Mutula Lwa Matanda (CODECO)
 Kipushi (1 seat) - Jacques Bakambe Shesh (CDD)
 Likasi ville (3 seats) - 
 Dany Banza Maloba (Ind.)
 Dieudonne Kayombo Sekesenu (ADECO)
 Idesbald Petwe Kapande (PPRD)
 Lubumbashi ville (11 seats) - 
 Moise Katumbi Chapwe (PPRD)
 Jean-Claude Muyambo Kyassa (CODECO)
 Augustin Katumba Mwanke (PPRD)
 Edouard Edo Kasongo Bin Mulonda (Ind.)
 Floribert Kaseba Makunko (PPRD)
 Nsungu Banza Mukalay (Ind.)
 Richard Muyej Mangeze (PPRD) 
 Honorius Kisimba Ngoy Ndalewe (UNAFEC)
 Jean Mbuyu Luyongola (PPRD) 
 Fifi Masuka Saini (MLC)
 Alexis Takizala Masoso (PDSC) 
 Mitawaba (1 seat) - Felicien Lukunga Katanga (PPRD) 
 Pweto (3 seats) - 
 Etienne Kisunka Cola (RSF)
 Philippe Katanti Mwitwa (PPRD)
 Jean-Pierre Ilunga Kampanyi

Tanganyika District - 17 seats 
 Kabalo (2 seats) - 
 Gerard Nkulu Mwenze (PPRD)
 Sophie Kakudji Yumba (UNAFEC)
 Kalemie (4 seats) - 
 Alain Mulya Kalonda (PRM)
 Marie-Louise Mwange Musangu (PPRD)
 Vicky Katumwa Mukalay (FSIR)
 Zephyrin Kasindi Yumbe Sulbali (Ind.)
 Kongolo (3 seats) - 
 Theodore Mugalu Wa Mahingu (PPRD)
 Jacques Muyumba Ndubula (PPRD)
 Richard Ngoy Kitangala (CCU)
 Manono (3 seats) - 
 Gerardine Kasongo Ngoie (PPRD)
 Kasongo Banze Bwana (PPRD)
 Jacques Nkulu Mupenda Mukala (Ind.)
 Moba (4 seats) - 
 Charles Mwando Nsimba (UNADEF)
 Guillaume Samba Kaputo (PPRD) 
 Perpetue Kapindo Tundwa (UNADEF)
 Maurice Kafindo Bin Kosamu (UNADEF)
 Nyunzu (1 seat) - Dieudonne Kamona Yumba (PRM)

Kinshasa - 58 deputies 
 Kinshasa 1 (14 seats) - 
 Adam Bombole Intole (MLC) 
 Thomas Luhaka Losendjola (MLC)
 Wivine Moleka Nsolo (PPRD)
 Pierre-Jacques Chalupa (Ind.)
 Franck Diongo Shamba (MLP)  
 Yves Kisombe Bisika Lisasi (MLC)
 Jacques Luzitu Jsipako (PALU)
 Serge Kayembe Mwadianvita (CP)
 Daniel Mbuya Mukiewa (PCB)
 Flory Dumbi Mbadu (ABAKO)
 Pierre Dibenga Tshibundi (ACDC)
 Anicet Kuzunda Mutangiji (ANC-PF)
 Andre Mavungu Mbunga (CRD)
 Helene Ndombe Sita (CDC)   
 Kinshasa 2 (14 seats) - 
 Ifoto Ingele (CP) 
 Pitchou Bolenge Yoma (MLC) 
 Eugene Kabongo Ngoy (MLC)
 Lievin Lumande Mada  
 Colette Tshomba Ntundu (FR) 
 Yvon Yanga Kidiamene (UDR)
 Francis Kalombo Tambwa (PPRD)
 Ellysee Dimandja Ambowa Feza (CODECO)
 Pascal Kamba Mandungu (FONUS)
 Francine Kimasi Bekili (ABAKO) 
 Jean-Baptiste Mbalu Kikuta (MSR)
 Annie Dianzenza Mayasilwa (CDC)
 Leaon Kisolokele Lukelo (DC)
 Jean-Pierre Kutudisa Panda (PALU)
 Kinshasa 3 (13 seats) - 
 Jean-Oscar Kiziamina Kibila (RCPC)
 Didier Mudizo Musengo (MLC)
 Godefroid Mayobo Mpwene Ngantient
 Dominique Kabengele Ngoy (MLC) 
 Pius Muabilu Mbayu Mukala (PPRD)
 Neron Mbungu Mbungu (UNADEC)
 Denis Kambayi Cimbumbu (CP)
 Jean-Pierre Lisanga Bonganga (CDC)
 Marcel Mazhunda Zanda (ACDC)
 Ambroise Midi Giamany Zozey (FR)
 Philippe Mbenza Kunietama (MSR)
 Evariste Ejiba Yamapia (RCD)
 Marie-Therese Dembo Olama (ANCC)
 Kinshasa 4 (17 seats) - 
 Jean Kahusu Makwela (PALU) 
 Blaise Ditu Monizi (Ind.) 
 Marie-Ange Lukiana-Mufwankolo Dialukupa (PPRD)
 Esaie Nsimba Lutete (ABAKO)
 Cleophas Guyzanga Guyandiga (PALU)
 Arthur Athu A Guyimba (PALU)
 Fidele Babala Wandu (MLC)
 Leonne Kati-Kati Mundele (ANCC)
 Charles Makengo Ngombe Matoka (CP)
 Gamanda Matadi Nenga (RCD)
 Francois Luemba Buela (OPEKA)
 Arthur Wanga Kipangu (FR)
 Victor Nguala Bananika (CODECO)
 Joseph Mbenza Thubi (Ind.)
 Christophe Kingotolo Lunianga (MSR)
 Faustin Mputu Bokenga (CCU)
 Louise Nzazi Muana (ADECO)

Maniema - 12 deputies 
 Kabambare (2 seats) - 
 Emmanuel Ramazani Shadary (PPRD)
 Richard Agamba Amuri (MSR) 
 Kailo (1 seat) - Pascal-Joseph M'Vula Kapome (PPRD)
 Kasongo (3 seats) - 
 Barnabe Kikaya Bin Karubi (PPRD)
 Justin Kalumba Mwana Ngongo (PANU)
 Didier Molisho Sadi (MSR)
 Kibombo (1 seat) - Jean-Pierre Kalema Losona (PPRD)
 Kindu city (1 seat) - Alexis Thambwe Mwamba (Ind.)
 Lubutu (1 seat) - Bernard Guyeni Masili (PPRD)
 Pangi (2 seats) -
 Athanase Matenda Kyelu (Ind.)
 Jean-Dieudonne Bosaga Sumaili (PPRD)
 Punia (1 seat) - Gustave Omba Bindimono (Ind.)

Nord-Kivu (48 deputies) 
 Beni territory (10 seats) - 
 Salomon Banamuhere Baliene (PPRD)
 Pheresie Kakule Molo (DCF-COFEDEC) 
 Gilbert Paluku Wa Muthethi (Ind.)
 Kakusi Katsuva Syahembulwa (DCF-COFEDEC) 
 Jean-Bosco Mapati Kahindo (FR)           
 Vincent Sibkasibka Malaume (PPRD)  
 Jerome Kamate Lukundu (FR) 
 Edmondus Kasereka Vukutu (MSR)
 Schadrac Baitsura Musowa (RCD)
 Jacques-Protais Kimeme Bin Rukohe (MLC) 
 Beni ville (2 seats) - 
 Jean-Louis-Ernest Kyaviro Malemo (FR)
 Esdras Sindani Mulonde (PPRD)
 Butembo ville (4 seats) - 
 Godefroy Bayoli Kambale
 Muhiwa Kakule Sumbusu (FR)
 Pierre Pay Pay Wa Syakassighe (DCF-COFEDEC) 
 Ferdinand Kambere Kalumbi (PPRD)
 Goma ville (4 seats) - 
 Dieudonne-Jacques Bakungu Mythondeke (PPRD)
 Alphonse Muhindo Kasole (PPRD)
 Dieudonne Kambale Kalimumbalu (DCF-COFEDEC)
 Elvis Mutiri Wa Bashara (MLC) 
 Lubero (9 seats) - 
 Juliette Mbambu Mughole (UPRDI) 
 Vikwirahangi Paluku Mikundi (PPRD)
 Jeannette Kavira Mapera (DCF-COFEDEC) 
 Jerome Kambale Lusenge Bonane (DCF-COFEDEC)
 Jacques Katembo Makata (MSR)
 Emmanuel Bahati Vitsange (FR)
 Christien Katsuva Sikuli (MSR) 
 Wavungire Matabishi Musakani (PPRD) 
 Enosch Kakule Byatekwa (CDC)
 Masisi (8 seats) - 
 Jules Mugiraneza Ndizeye (PANADI)
 Bertin Baganyingabo Kanyeshuli (RCD) 
 Valentin Balume Tussi (PPRD) 
 Francois Ayobangira Samuura (RCD) 
 Nephtali Nkizinkiko Mpawe (PANADI)
 Faustin Dunia Bakarani (MLC)
 Thomas V De Paul Safari Wa Kibancha (PPRD)
 Raymond Mushesha Ndoole (MSR)
 Nyiragongo (1 seat) - Joseph Ndalifite Hangi (PPRD)
 Rutshuru (8 seats) - 
 Come Sekimonyo Wa Magango (PPRD)
 Celestin Vunabandi Kanyamihigo (RCD) 
 Jean-Luc Mutokambali Luvanzayi (Ind.)
 Mwene-Songa Nyabirungu Mwene Songa (PPRD)
 Georges Sabiti Muhire (RCD)
 With-Xavier Buunda Baroki (PPRD)
 Jean-Bosco Barihima Ka-Butsiri (FR)
 Cyprien Iyamulemye Baragomanwa (PANADI)
 Walikale (2 seats) -
 Sabine Muhima Bintu (PPRD)
 Jeanne Bunda Bitendwa (MMM)

Orientale Province

Bas-Uele District - 7 seats 
 Aketi Territory (1 seat) - Georgette Agadi Bukani Bakwa (MLC)
 Ango Territory (1 seat) - Emmanuel Ngbalindie Sasa (Ind.)
 Bambesa Territory (1 seat) - Jean-Paul Nemoyato Bagebole (CDC)
 Bondo Territory (2 seats) - 
 Lucie Kipele Aky Azua (FR)
 Desire Koyengete Solo (UDEMO) 
 Buta Territory (1 seat) - Mohamed Bule Gbangolo Basabe (MLC)
 Poko Territory (1 seat) - Gilbert Tutu Tudeza Kango (MSR)

Haut-Uele District - 12 seats 
 Dungu (1 seat) 
 Jean-Dominique Takis Kumbo (Ind.)
 Faradje (2 seats) - 
 Jean Obote Sirika (PPRD)
 Jean–Christophe Budri Ngaduma (CDC)
 Niangara (1 seat) -
 Chrisostome Gbandazwa Masibando (MLC)
 Rungu (3 seats) - 
 Simon Bulupiy Galati (PPRD)
 Reginard Missa Amubuombe (MSR)
 Dieudonne Anziama Kamuzibami (FR)
 Wamba (3 seats) - 
 Celestin Bondomiso Bebisyame (FR)
 Jean-Valere Angalikiana Kalumbula (PPRD)
 Jean-Baudouin Idambituo Bakaoto (RPE)
 Watsa (2 seats) - 
 Vital Budu Tandema (FR)
 Jean-Pierre Batumoko Afozunde (FSDD)

Ituri District - 28 deputies 
 Aru (6 seats) - 
 Medard Autsai Asenga (PPRD) 
 Le Bon Mambo Mawa (PPRD)
 Casimir Sindani Anyama (PPRD)
 Baudouin Adia Leti Mawa (PPRD) 
 Donatien Kanyi Nzia (MLC)
 Martin Aza Bhatre (Ind.)
 Djugu (8 seats) - 
 Jean-Baptiste Dhetchuvi Matchu-Mandje (UPC) 
 Maurice Bura Pulunyo (PPRD) 
 Gilbert Ndjaba Kpande (PPRD)   
 Edouard Balembo Baloma Kasomba (UPC) 
 Martin Shalo Dudu (FR)
 Jean-Pierre Ngabu Kparri (CODECO) 
 Angele Tabu Makusi (MSR)
 Jean-Claude Logo Mugenyi (RCD)
 Irumu (5 seats) - 
 Gilbert Sugabo Ngbulabo (PPRD)
 Baudouin Adirodu Mawazo (FR)
 Pele Kaswara Tahigwomu (UPC)
 Mylet Furabo Tondabo 
 Claude Kabagambe Magbo (RCD)
 Mahagi (7 seats) - 
 Emmanuel Adubango Ali (PPRD)
 Wapol Upio Kakura (PPRD)   
 Jean-Bosco Ukumu Nyamuloka (Ind.)
 Pierre-Claver Uweka Ukaba (PPRD) 
 Moise Uwor Cwinya'ay (FR) 
 Dieudonne Upira Sunguma Kagimbi (MSR)
 Jean-Marie Uvoya Cwinya'ay (CODECO)
 Mambasa (2 seats) - 
 Joseph Ucci Mombele (FR)
 Cyprien Aleku Kitika (PPRD)

Tshopo District - 16 seats 
 Bafwasende (1 seat) - Michel Botoro Bodias (MSR)
 Banalia (1 seat) - Moke Mambango (PPRD)
 Basoko (2 seats) - 
 Claudien Likulia Lifoma (Ind.)
 Anastasie Moleko Moliwa (PPRD)
 Isangi (3 seats) - 
 Dieu-Donne Bolengetenge Balea (MSR)
 Jacques Bonyoma Falanga (PPRD)
 J Asumani Likalnganyo (CP)
 Kisangani ville (5 seats) - 
 Jean Yagi Sitolo (PPRD) 
 Emile Bongeli Ye Ikelo Ya Ato (PPRD)
 Jean Bamanisa Saidi (Ind.)
 Hubert Moliso Nendolo Bolita (CP)
 Freddy Isomela Iyongha (FR)
 Opala (1 seat) - Alexis Likunda Ndolo (MSR)
 Ubundu (2 seats) - 
 Gaston Musemena Bongala (PPRD)
 Nestor Tela Falanga (MSR) 
 Yahuma (1 seat) - Ernest Etula Libange (MLC)

Sud-Kivu - 32 seats) 
 Bukavu ville (5 seats) - 
 Vital Kamerhe (PPRD)
 Jean-Marie Bulambo Kilosho (PANU)
 Louis-Leonce Chirimwami Muderhwa (PPRD)
 Sylvanus Mushi Bonane (UPRDI)
 Felicien Milambo Ngongo (PPRD)
 Fizi (3 seats) - 
 Pardonne Kaliba Mulanga (PRM)
 Jean-Kevin Jemsi Mulengwa (DCF-COFEDEC) 
 Ferdinand Essambo Lukye (PPRD) 
 Idjwi (1 seat) - Paulin Bapolisi Bahuga Polepole (MSR)
 Kabare (4 seats)
 Celestin Cibalonza Byaterana (PPRD)
 Deogratias Mubalama Kashamangali (UPRDI)
 Modeste Bahati Lukwebo (Ind.)
 Solide Birindwa Chanikire (PPRD) 
 Kalehe (4 seats) - 
 Thomas Muulwa Kataala (PPRD)
 Gregoire Mirindi Carhangabo (PRP)
 Pius Bitakuya Dunia (MSR)
 Fernand Sumari Balike (CCU)
 Mwenga (3 seats) - 
 Damien Kwabene Mwetaminwa (PPRD)
 Leon Mumate Nyamatomwa (MSR)
 Justin Karhibahaza Mukuba (UPNAC)
 Shabunda (2 seats) - 
 Cyprien Kyamusoke Bamusulanga (PPRD)
 Auguste Mopipi Mukulumanya
 Uvira (5 seats) - 
 Wildor Makonero Wildor (PPRD)
 Martin Bitijula Mahimba (MSR)
 Marthe Bashomberwa Lalia (PPRD)
 Samuel Kanyegere Lwaboshi (Mai-Mai)
 Justin Bitakwira Bihona-Hayi (PCGB)
 Walungu (5 seats) - 
 Aimé Boji Sangara Bamanyirwe (PPRD)
 Manasse Bashizi Zirimwabagabo (CVP)
 Christophe Masumbuko Bashomba (PCGB)
 Leonard Masu-Ga-Rugamika (PPRD)
 Alphonse Munamire Mungu-Akonkwa (UPRDI)

References

Politics of the Democratic Republic of the Congo
Lists
Democratic Republic of the Congo history-related lists